is a Japanese politician who formerly served as Minister of Justice in the cabinet of Shinzō Abe.

He was born in Toyama and obtained his LL.B. from the University of Tokyo. After graduation, he worked in the Ministry of Labour. He resigned from this position in 1988 and was elected to the Diet of Japan in 1990.

He served as Parliamentary Vice-Minister for Health, Labour and Welfare under Tomiichi Murayama, as deputy director of the Liberal Democratic Party, as Parliamentary Vice-Minister for Labour Relations under Keizō Obuchi and Yoshirō Mori, as Vice-Minister of Justice in the second Mori cabinet and as Assistant Cabinet Secretary under Jun'ichirō Koizumi. He strongly argues for equal rights for homosexuals in Parliament.

He was appointed Minister of Justice on September 26, 2006.

His religion is Tenrikyo.

References 

1943 births
Living people
People from Toyama (city)
University of Tokyo alumni
Tenrikyo
Members of the House of Representatives (Japan)
Ministers of Justice of Japan
Liberal Democratic Party (Japan) politicians
21st-century Japanese politicians